Hilton Head Christian Academy (HHCA) is a private, college preparatory Christian school for kindergarten through 12th grade, located in Bluffton, South Carolina, United States.

History
HHCA was founded in 1979 and sits on a 27.7 acre campus in the town of Bluffton. It was originally located on nearby Hilton Head Island but relocated to Bluffton in January 2021. It is the only school in Beaufort County accredited by both the Association of Christian Schools International (ACSI) and the Southern Association of Colleges and Schools (SACS).

References

External links 
 Hilton Head Christian Academy

Christian schools in South Carolina
Private elementary schools in South Carolina
Private middle schools in South Carolina
Private high schools in South Carolina
Educational institutions established in 1979
Schools in Beaufort County, South Carolina
1979 establishments in South Carolina